Scythris siccella is a moth of the family Scythrididae first described by the German entomologist Philipp Christoph Zeller in 1839, found in Europe.

Description
The moth flies in July and can be found on flowers, preferring dry sandy habitats. It has a wingspan of circa 9 mm.

The larvae can be found in May and are polyphagous, feeding on the following species; kidney vetch (Anthyllis vulneraria), sea thrift (Armeria maritima), chickweed (Cerastium species), common rock-rose (Helianthemum nummularium), common bird's-foot trefoil (Lotus corniculatus), restharrow (Ononis spinosa subsp. procurrens), mouse-ear hawkweed ( Pilosella officinarum), plantain (Plantago species), small scabious (Scabiosa columbaria), thyme (Thymus species) and rock-rose (Tuberaria species). Larvae form a tube made from grains of sand and silk attached to the stem of the plant and mine into the leaves. Pupation is in a silken cocoon just below the surface of the sand.

Distribution
The moth is found in Europe. In Great Britain it is known only from Chesil Beach, Dorset.

References

siccella
Moths described in 1839
Moths of Europe
Taxa named by Philipp Christoph Zeller